La Cumbre (The Summit) is a town and municipality in Colombia, northwest of Cali, in the Valle del Cauca Department. It is located in the West Andes above the city of Yumbo.

La Cumbre is known for its simplicity, lack of hustle and bustle and small-town way of life.  Many day tourists from Cali travel to La Cumbre by car or tourist train. The weather is cooler, and considered a welcome respite from the sunny and often hot weather of Cali. The most important industry in the area is agriculture.

Polito-Geographical Limits 

This municipality is surround by the following municipalities of Valle del Cauca Department:
 North: Restrepo.
 South: Yumbo and Cali.
 East: Vijes
 West: Dagua

Areas of the Municipality 

The Corregimiento of Bitaco occupies the southernmost portion of the municipality. Within this area is the section called Chicoral which is home to the Hindú Tea Plantation and the Bitaco Forest Reserve.  This area connects to the west with Dapa through a foggy, forested pass that crosses into the Cauca Valley.

Image Gallery

External links 
La Cumbre ¡Unidos por la Cumbre!

References

Municipalities of Valle del Cauca Department